Equinunk Creek is a  tributary of the Delaware River in Wayne County, Pennsylvania in the United States.

Equinunk Creek (Lenape for "where cloth is distributed") joins the Delaware River at Equinunk.

See also
List of Pennsylvania rivers

References

Rivers of Pennsylvania
Tributaries of the Delaware River
Rivers of Wayne County, Pennsylvania